The 1876 Horsham by-election was held on 29 February 1876.  The byelection was fought due to the previous by-election being declared void.  This had resulted in the election of the Liberal MP Robert Henry Hurst (junior).

The Conservative candidate, Sir Hardinge Gifford, had been appointed as Solicitor General the year before, although he had not yet got a seat in the Commons.   It was won by the Liberal candidate James Clifton Brown.

Votes

References

1876 elections in the United Kingdom
1876 in England
19th century in Sussex
Horsham
By-elections to the Parliament of the United Kingdom in Sussex constituencies
February 1876 events